The Republic of India has several official national symbols including a historical document, a flag, an emblem, an anthem, a memorial tower as well as several national heroes. The design of the national flag was officially adopted by the Constituent Assembly just before independence, on July 22, 1947. Other symbols that were designated on various occasions include the national animal, bird, fruit and tree.

List of national and official symbols of India

See also 
 List of Indian state symbols

References

External links 
 National Symbols. Know India Programme.
 National Symbols. Govt. of India Official website.